The International Neuroinformatics Coordinating Facility (INCF) is an international non-profit organization with the mission to develop, evaluate, and endorse standards and best practices that embrace the principles of Open, FAIR, and Citable neuroscience. INCF also provides training on how standards and best practices facilitate reproducibility and enables the publishing of the entirety of research output, including data and code. INCF was established in 2005 by recommendations of the Global Science Forum working group of the OECD. The INCF is hosted by the Karolinska Institutet in Stockholm, Sweden. The INCF network comprises institutions, organizations, companies, and individuals active in neuroinformatics, neuroscience, data science, technology, and science policy and publishing. The Network is organized in governing bodies and working groups which coordinate various categories of global neuroinformatics activities that guide and oversee the development and endorsement of standards and best practices, as well as provide training on how standards and best practices facilitate reproducibility and enables the publishing of the entirety of research output, including data and code. The current Directors are Mathew Abrams and Helena Ledmyr, and the Governing Board Chair is Maryann Martone

The INCF network aims to promote the application of computational approaches to understanding the brain and to develop the infrastructure required to use computational methods to integrate and analyze diverse data across scales, techniques, and species to understand the brain and positively impact the health and well-being of society.

Background 

A key element to successfully understanding the nervous system is the integration of neuroscience with information sciences. The field that studies the nervous system, neuroscience, has responded to the fantastic challenge of understanding how our brain works with the use of the most sophisticated technologies, from studies on the genome to those on brain imaging of behaviour in humans and other species, under different functional states, and at all intervening analytical levels. This effort has resulted in large quantities of data, which are ever increasing at higher levels of complexity. The data produced are heterogeneous, coming from different levels of study and modalities of analysis. To rise to this challenge of integration, and to ensure efficient and maximum use of these data, it is now necessary to develop and create these shared resources: 
 neuroscience data and knowledge databases; 
 analytical and modelling tools; and
 computational models.
This challenge is being met through the merging of neurosciences with information science – the field of neuroinformatics.

History

Genesis 
The recommendation to coordinate international efforts in the new field of neuroinformatics was first made in the report on bioinformatics elaborated under the aegis of the then OECD Megascience Forum in 1998. Following extensive discussions in the Neuroinformatics Working Group of the Global Science Forum chaired by Dr. Stephen H. Koslow, the proposal to create an International Neuroinformatics Coordinating Council and a system of grant funding for neuroinformatics research was then presented in 2002. This project was endorsed by OECD science ministers at their meeting in January 2004. Sixteen countries (Australia, Canada, China, the Czech Republic, Denmark, Finland, France, Germany, India, Italy, Japan, the Netherlands, Norway, Sweden, Switzerland, the United Kingdom, the United States and Victoria, Australia), as well as the European Commission, then elaborated the working documents that form the legal basis for the INCF and the Programme in International Neuroinformatics (PIN).

Establishment 

The conditions laid out for the creation of the INCF were met in July 2005, seven countries (the Czech Republic, Finland, Germany, Norway, Sweden, Switzerland, and the United States) having signed the Understanding document and pledged their financial contribution.  A bid to host the INCF Secretariat was launched. Two proposals were received and, as instructed by the Governing Board, on November 3, the OECD convened a panel of experts to review and rank the proposals. The panel assigned the higher ranking to the Swedish proposal, and this recommendation was endorsed by the INCF Governing Board when it met at OECD headquarters on November 28.  Following extensive international discussions, the INCF was officially inaugurated in February 2007, with headquarters at the Karolinska Institute in Stockholm.

INCF promotes collaboration in neuroinformatics and reproducibility in brain research by

 providing coordination of global neuroscience infrastructure through the development and endorsement of standards and best practices in support of open and FAIR (Findable Accessible Interoperable Reusable) neuroscience (FAIR data)  
 training researchers, administrators, and students on how neuroinformatics promotes rigor and reproducibility, open and FAIR science and publishing the entirety of their research output: narrative, data, and code  
 encouraging neuroscience as discipline to move towards FORCE (FAIR, Open, Research-object based, and Citable Ecosystem)
 promoting the advancement and continued development of neuroinformatics as a scientific discipline

Key Program deliverables
include
 Waxholm Space (WHS),  a coordinate-based reference space of the rodent brain
 Scalable Brain Atlas, a web-based display engine for brain atlases, imaging data, and topologies
 NineML, a general model description language 
 The Multi-Simulation Coordinator (MUSIC), which allows large-scale neuron simulators and other applications to communicate during runtime
 The Neuroimaging Informatics Data Model (NI-DM), a framework for the generation, storage, and query of metadata including provenance information
 KnowledgeSpace, a community-based encyclopaedia that links brain research concepts with data, models and literature from around the world
 TrainingSpace, an online repository linking neuroinformatics training resources developed both by INCF, our partners, and existing community resources.

See also
 Brain Imaging Data Structure (BIDS)
 Blue Brain Project
 Budapest Reference Connectome
 Human Connectome Project
 List of neuroscience databases
 Neuroscience Information Framework

References

External links 
 
 Neuroinformatics Congress – 2019 (Warsaw, Poland); 2018 (Montreal, Canada); 2017; 2016; 2015; 2014; 2013; 2012; 2011; 2010; 2009; 2008
 Neuroscience Peer Review Consortium
 

Neuroinformatics
Computational neuroscience
Neuroscience organizations